Svein Harald Ludvigsen (born 18 July 1946) is a Norwegian former politician for the Conservative Party and a convicted sex offender. He served as a member of parliament (1989–2001), deputy leader of the Conservative Party (1990–1991), minister of fisheries (2001–2005), and county governor of Troms (2006–2014). In 2019 he was convicted of sexually abusing three young men, and sentenced to five years imprisonment; his conviction and sentence became final in January 2020.

Political career

Ludvigsen was born in Hillesøy, the son of a fishing boat captain. Before entering politics Ludvigsen worked as a businessman and local banker. On the local level, Ludvigsen was a member of the executive committee of Tromsø municipal council in the periods 1971–1975, 1979–1983, and 1987–1989. He has chaired the municipal and county party chapters, and from 1990 to 1991 he was deputy leader of the Conservative Party nationwide.

He was elected to the Norwegian Parliament from Troms county in 1989, and was re-elected on two occasions. From 2001 to 2005, when the second Bondevik cabinet held office, Ludvigsen was Minister of Fisheries and Coastal Affairs. In 2001, he was appointed County Governor of Troms, but because of his job as cabinet minister he assumed the office on 17 January 2006.

Conviction for sexual abuse
On the 4 July 2019, he was convicted of abusing his position to gain sexual favours from three vulnerable male persons  and sentenced to five years imprisonment.

References

External links 
 

1946 births
Living people
21st-century Norwegian criminals
Norwegian male criminals
Norwegian politicians convicted of crimes
Members of the Storting
Government ministers of Norway
Conservative Party (Norway) politicians
Politicians from Tromsø
County governors of Norway
21st-century Norwegian politicians
20th-century Norwegian politicians
Norwegian LGBT politicians
Norwegian prisoners and detainees
Prisoners and detainees of Norway
Violence against men in Europe
LGBT conservatism